Gregh is a surname. Notable people with the surname include:

Fernand Gregh (1873–1960), French poet and literary critic
François-Didier Gregh (1906–1992), Monegasque politician
Louis Gregh (1843–1915), French composer and music publisher

See also
Gregg (surname)